The Olympus OM-D E-M10 Mark II is a digital mirrorless system camera announced by Olympus Corporation on August 25, 2015.

The E-M10 Mark II features a 5-axis in-body image stabilization system, an upgrade to the 3-axis design found in its predecessor, the original E-M10. 

The E-M10 Mark II was succeeded by the E-M10 Mark III, offering 4K video capabilities.

Features 

 16 megapixel Live MOS 4/3 size sensor
 Micro Four Thirds system
 SLR-style body
 2.3m dot electronic viewfinder
 8 fps burst rate
 1/4000s fastest shutter speed with mechanical shutter
 1/16000s fastest shutter speed with electronic shutter
 81 contrast detection autofocus points, no phase detection
 1080p/60 fps video with 77 Mbit/s bitrate
 Built-in flash
 Wi-Fi
 Tilting touchscreen with a resolution of 1,040 million dots
 390g body weight

Drawbacks 
 No minijack socket (impossible to connect an external microphone)

Differences with the Olympus OM-D E-M10

 5 axis sensor stabilization system, instead of a 3 axis.
 Larger resolution viewfinder (2.3m dots instead of 1.4m)
 AF Targeting Pad (select the autofocus point on the touchscreen while composing with the viewfinder)
 Electronic shutter (1/16000s fastest shutter speed)
 UHS-II support
 4K time lapse (shoot up to 999 frames with 5 fps)
 Improved ergonomics

References

OM-D E-M10 Mark II
Cameras introduced in 2015